Vice Admiral Jeremy Paul Kyd,  (born 14 August 1967) is a former senior Royal Navy officer. He has served as the Lieutenant Governor of Jersey since October 2022. He formerly served as Fleet Commander from March 2019 to September 2021.

Early life and education

Kyd was born in August 1967. He was educated at King's School, Macclesfield, and the University of Southampton.

Naval career

Kyd was commissioned into the Royal Navy on 20 October 1990. He was given command of the frigate  in 2004.

In February 2014, Kyd was named as the first future seagoing captain of the British aircraft carrier  as well as Commander United Kingdom Task Group. Kyd became commanding officer of HMS Queen Elizabeth in May 2016, replacing Captain Simon Petitt, the Senior Naval Officer of Queen Elizabeth who had effectively been CO of the ship since 2012. Kyd routinely wore the Royal Navy rank of captain while retaining the substantive rank of commodore, following historical custom. He became Commander United Kingdom Carrier Strike Group in February 2015.

Kyd was appointed as Commander United Kingdom Maritime Forces and Rear Admiral Surface Ships in October 2018 and promoted to rear admiral on 19 November. In March 2019, he was promoted to the substantive rank of vice admiral and took up the appointment of Fleet Commander. He was appointed a Commander of the Order of the British Empire (CBE) in the 2019 Birthday Honours. He retired on 11 March 2022.

Lieutenant-Governor of Jersey

Kyd became Lieutenant-Governor of Jersey on 8 October 2022 replacing Air Marshal Sir Stephen Dalton, who retired in June 2022.

Personal life

Kyd is a Younger Brother of Trinity House and a member of the Royal Yacht Squadron. He is married and has four sons. He was Vice President of Ice Sports for the Naval Service, and President of the Royal Navy & Royal Marines Boxing Association during his time in the Royal Navy.

References

|-

|-

1967 births
Living people
Governors of Jersey
Royal Navy vice admirals
British academic administrators
Alumni of the University of Southampton
Commanders of the Order of the British Empire
Members of Trinity House